IFAS may refer:

 Institute of Food and Agricultural Sciences
 Integrated Fixed-Film Activated Sludge, a sewage treatment process
 International French adjectival system, a grading system used in mountaineering
 Irish Federation of Astronomical Societies
 Institute for Advanced Studies, an education organization
 Indian Frontier Administrative Service, created in 1954 and merged into Indian Administrative Service in 1968, see